The Norwegian Museum of Contemporary Art is a museum in Oslo, Norway. Since 2003, it is administratively a part of the National Museum of Art, Architecture and Design.

History
The Norwegian Museum of Contemporary Art was established in 1988 with works received from the National Gallery of Norway and opened in 1990 as a museum for art produced after World War II. In 1992, the National Touring Exhibition (Riksgalleriet)   was separated as an independent entity. The building, designed by architect Ingvar Hjorth (1862-1927), was formerly used by Norges Bank. Former directors of the museum were Jan Brockmann (1988–1996) and Per Bjarne Boym (1996–2003).

References

1988 establishments in Norway
Art museums established in 1988
Contemporary art galleries in Norway
Museums in Oslo